Redzuan Muhamad Radzy (born 5 April 1981) is a Malaysian footballer who currently plays for KDMM F.C. in the Malaysia FAM League. He is the member of Malaysia senior team and Malaysia under-23 in 2003 until 2004.

He started his career with clubside Kedah JKR in 2001. He also the key player for Malaysia under-23 in 2001 and 2003 Southeast Asian Games.

In 2002, he won the 2002 Premier Two League with Kedah. On the next season, he move to Negeri Sembilan but return to Kedah. He later sign for Johor FC. In 2006, he released by his club and sign a deal with Sabah. He released after the season ended and join Johor Pasir Gudang in 2009.

He rejoined Sabah on loan in late 2010 for their Malaysia Cup campaign. For the 2011 season, he joins club side Muar Municipal Council FC.

References

External links

Malaysian footballers
Malaysia international footballers
Living people
1981 births
Sabah F.C. (Malaysia) players
Negeri Sembilan FA players
People from Kedah
Footballers at the 2002 Asian Games
Association football defenders
Asian Games competitors for Malaysia